The Apostolic Administration of Uzbekistan is a Roman Catholic (Latin Church) Apostolic Administration (pre-diocesan jurisdiction; originally an Independent Mission) for the Catholics of Uzbekistan (West Turkistan, Central Asia).

It is exempt, i.e. directly subject to the Holy See (not part of any ecclesiastical province) and entitled to a titular bishop.

Its episcopal see is the Cathedral of the Sacred Heart of Jesus, in the national capital Tashkent.

History 
On September 29, 1997, the Holy See established the Mission sui iuris of Uzbekistan on territory split off from the then Apostolic Administration of Kazakhstan (shortly after promoted to Diocese of Karaganda, after missiones sui iuris were also split off for Tajikistan, Turkmenistan and Kyrgyzstan, all in 1997).

On 1 April 2005, the independent mission was promoted as Apostolic Administration.

Ordinaries 
So far, all its superiors were East Europe-born missionary members of the Conventual Franciscans (O.F.M. Conv.)

 Ecclesiastical superior of the Mission sui iuris 
 Father Krzysztof Kukulka, O.F.M. Conv. (1997.09.29 – 2005.04.01)

 Apostolic Administrators
 Jerzy Maculewicz, O.F.M. Conv. (2005.04.01 – ...), titular bishop of Nara

See also

Roman Catholicism in Uzbekistan

Sources and external links
 GigaCatholic

Apostolic administrations
Catholic Church in Uzbekistan